Heyerdahl is a surname. Notable people with the surname include:

Anders Heyerdahl (1832–1918), Norwegian violinist, composer and folk music collector
Christopher Heyerdahl, Canadian actor
Elise Heyerdahl (1858–1921), Norwegian politician, teacher, and feminist 
Halvor Heyerdahl Rasch (1805–1883), Norwegian zoologist
Hans Heyerdahl (1857–1913), Norwegian painter
Phoebe Heyerdahl, character on Hey Arnold!
Severin Andreas Heyerdahl (1870–1940), Norwegian physician
Thor Heyerdahl (1914–2002), Norwegian ethnographer and adventurer

See also
2473 Heyerdahl, a main-belt asteroid
Ayerdhal

Norwegian-language surnames